Minister of Finance (Macedonian: Министeр за финансии) is the person in charge of the Ministry of Finance of North Macedonia. Fatmir Besimi is the current Minister of Finance, since 30 August 2020.

List of ministers

See also
 Government of North Macedonia

References

Government agencies of North Macedonia
Government of North Macedonia
North Macedonia